Huskey is a surname. Notable people with the surname include:

Brian Huskey (born 1968), American actor and comedian
Butch Huskey (born 1971), American baseball player
Harry Huskey (1916–2017), American computer designer
Kristine A. Huskey, American lawyer
Michael Huskey (1841–1864), Union Navy sailor and Medal of Honor recipient
Roy Huskey, Jr. (1956–1997), American musician
Velma Huskey (1917–1991), American computing pioneer